p-Anisic acid, also known as 4-methoxybenzoic acid or  draconic acid, is one of the isomers of anisic acid. The term "anisic acid" often refers to this form specifically. It is a white crystalline solid which is insoluble in water, highly soluble in alcohols and soluble in ether, and ethyl acetate.

Synthesis and occurrence 
p-Anisic acid is found naturally in anise. It is generally obtained by the oxidation of anethole or p-methoxyacetophenone.

Uses 
p-Anisic acid has antiseptic properties. It is also used as an intermediate in the preparation of more complex organic compounds.

References 

Benzoic acids
O-methylated natural phenols